Richard Ivor "Red" Nixon (October 5, 1901 – March 4, 1975) was an American politician from the state of Montana. He served in the Montana State Senate, and in 1961 was that body's majority leader.

References

1901 births
1975 deaths
People from Blaine County, Montana
Democratic Party Montana state senators
20th-century American politicians